Bonfield is a township in northeastern Ontario, Canada, on the Mattawa River in Nipissing District.

The township comprises the communities of Blanchard's Landing, Bonfield, Grand Desert, and Rutherglen. The community of Bonfield is connected to Ontario Highway 17 by Ontario Highway 531, while Rutherglen is located directly on the route of Highway 17 and the other communities are located on local roads within the township.

Named after James Bonfield (1825-1900), one-time M.P.P for South Renfrew in the Ontario legislature.  Town and neighbouring township were amalgamated on January 1, 1975.

In 2007, Bonfield, along with the town of Mattawa and the townships of Papineau-Cameron, Mattawan and Calvin cooperated to create a newly branded Mattawa Voyageur Country tourist region in order to promote the area.

History
The community of Bonfield was first settled in 1882 as a station on the Canadian Pacific Railway.

Located on the north shore of Lake Nosbonsing, where the railway crosses the Kaibuskong River, this place was originally named by the CPR as Callander Station. The community of Callander, on the South-East Bay of Lake Nipissing, had been named Callander in 1880, to honour the birthplace in Scotland of Duncan McIntyre, then president of the Canada Central Railway (CCR). It was at this place on the shore of Lake Nipissing, that the CCR intended to connect with the proposed eastern terminus of the CPR. In 1881 the Canada Central Railway was merged into the Canadian Pacific, as McIntyre became its vice president. As construction of the railway approached Lake Nipissing from the east, it turned away from the South-East Bay, towards the North Bay of Lake Nipissing instead. This was the closest point the CPR would come to the village of Callander, therefore this place was named Callander Station.

After the Northern and Pacific Junction Railway established a station in the original village of Callander in 1886 and was taken over by the Grand Trunk Railway in 1888, there was much confusion between the station in Callander and Callander Station. The CPR location, Callander Station was renamed Bonfield, adopting the name of the township in which it is located.

Communities

Bonfield
Rutherglen
Blanchard's Landing
Grand Desert

Demographics 

World Records
Bonfield is home to 'Jake' the cat with the most number of toes.  Jake was born in 2002 and has 7 toes on each paw; with a total of 28.

See also
List of townships in Ontario
List of francophone communities in Ontario

References

External links 

Municipalities in Nipissing District
Single-tier municipalities in Ontario
Township municipalities in Ontario